is a Prefectural Natural Park in southern Chiba Prefecture, Japan. First designated for protection in 1951, the park's central feature is Mount Tomi. The park is wholly within the municipality of Minamibōsō.

See also
 National Parks of Japan

References

External links
  Map of Tomisan Prefectural Natural Park

Parks and gardens in Chiba Prefecture
Protected areas established in 1951
1951 establishments in Japan